Malaxis bayardii, or Bayard's adder's-mouth orchid, is a species of orchid native to northeastern North America. It is found from Massachusetts to North Carolina, with isolated populations in Ohio and Nova Scotia. There are historical reports of the plant formerly growing in Vermont and New Jersey, but it seems to have been extirpated in those two states It grows in dry, open woods and pine barrens at elevations of less than 600 m (2000 feet).

Malaxis bayardii is a terrestrial herb up to 26 cm (10.4 inches) tall. It produces a pseudobulb up to 20 mm in diameter. It generally has only one leaf, occasionally two, about halfway up the stem. Flowers are small and green, borne in a raceme of up to 70 flowers.

Conservation status
It is listed as a special concern species and believed extirpated in Connecticut, as rare Massachusetts, and as endangered in New Jersey and in New York (state).

References

External links
 Among Rhode Island Wildflowers, Malaxis bayardii
 
 New York Natural Heritage Program
 
 Digital Atlas of the Virginia Flora
 Natural Heritage & Endangered Species Program, Massachusetts Division of Fisheries & Wildlife

Orchids of the United States
Plants described in 1936
Flora of Nova Scotia
Orchids of Canada
bayardii